Marija Guguljanova (born 11 November 1999) is a Macedonian female handballer for ŽRK Metalurg and the North Macedonia national team.

She represented the North Macedonia at the 2022 European Women's Handball Championship.

References

External links

1999 births
Living people
People from Bitola